Aggi Ravva is a 1981 Telugu-language action film, produced by N. T. Rama Rao under the Ramakrishna Cine Studios banner and directed by K. Bapayya. It stars N. T. Rama Rao and Sridevi, with music composed by K. V. Mahadevan. The film is inspired by an English movie. The film was a Hit at the box office.

Plot
Ramu is young and energetic and the only son of I. G. Raja Shekaram, whose aim is to see his son as a police officer. But his timid mother Meenakshi disagrees. Meanwhile, Ramu falls in love with a beautiful girl Vani. Here Ramu makes a plan as if he is working in Vani's company and in the name of promotion, he leaves for the police training. Apart from this, at a town called Nagarajapuram, three traitors make a lot of atrocities, Narasimham, Bhairavaiah and Menaka, who behave like respectable citizens in the society. These people perpetrate many activities such as smuggling, gambling, prostitution, woman-trafficking, etc. Here no one dares to question them and if any police officer who protests will be killed. I. G. Raja Shekaram assigns the case to his nephew Inspector Suryam but they trap him also in their custody by kidnapping his sister Radha. Now Raja Shekaram himself camps in the area when the traitors attack him and in the shootout, he loses a limb. At the same time, Ramu successfully comes back from the police training. But seeing his father's condition, a volcano bursts in his heart. At present, Ramu wants to take revenge against those criminals, he requests govt and makes his appointment at Nagarajapuram. By taking his father's blessings Ramu reaches Najarajapuram and before leaving he tells his father not to reveal this secret to his mother. Immediately, stepping he gives a direct warning to the traitors. After that, he catches them red-handed and presents them in the court, but they successfully escape from the sentence. On that night they capture Ramu, torture him badly and throws on the road. They keep their danger flag as a symbol, that's why no one comes forward for his rescue. Fortunately, Vani passing from that way spots and takes him to hospital. After recovery, Ramu crushes them all when they put a case on him. In the court where he shows the evil deed happened to him by which the court decides him as innocent. Here Ramu understands that anger is not only the source to catch criminals it should also require a proper wit. So, he changes his attire along with Vani and in various forms of disguise, he collects the pieces of evidence against them. Narasimham learns of this when he kidnaps Raja Shekaram and also kills his wife Meenakshi. Seeing his mother's dead body, Ramu destroys their empire and gets them arrested. Finally, the movie ends on a happy note with the marriage of Ramu and Vani.

Cast
N. T. Rama Rao as Ramu 
Sridevi as Vani 
Satyanarayana as Narasimham 
Mohan Babu as Inspector Suryam
Jaggayya as I. G. Raja Shekaram 
Allu Ramalingaiah as Bhairavaiah
Raja Babu as Vinayak 
S. Varalakshmi as Meenakshi
Kavitha as Menaka
Rajyalakshmi as Radha
Sukumari as Vani's aunt
Chandana Chowdary as Geetha

Soundtrack

Music composed by K. V. Mahadevan. Lyrics were written by Acharya Aatreya.

References

External links
 

Indian action films
Films directed by K. Bapayya
Films scored by K. V. Mahadevan
Indian remakes of American films
1981 action films
1981 films